Camille Mary Kelly Gottlieb (born 15 July 1998) is a anti-drunk-driving campaigner, influencer and relative of the Monegasque princely family. She is the daughter of Princess Stéphanie of Monaco and the grand-daughter of Grace Kelly.

Biography 
Born in 1998, Gottlieb's parents are Princess Stéphanie of Monaco and Jean Raymond Gottlieb; her parents met when her father worked as her mother's bodyguard. Since her parents did not marry, she is not in the line of succession. She studied at the University of Nice for a degree in Literature.

Since graduation Gottlieb has worked with a number of charities, including establishing Be Safe Monaco, which campaigns against drink-driving. Gottlieb founded this charity after a friend died whilst riding a scooter having consumed alcohol above safe levels to drive. Gottlieb is teetotal. Her activism also extends to animal rights.

Comparisons have been drawn by magazines such as Harper's Bazaar and Tatler, between her and her grandmother, the actress Grace Kelly, since they share physical similarities. The New York Post has also described Gottlieb as a fashion influencer due to her social media presence.

References

External links 

 
 

Monegasque Roman Catholics
1998 births
Living people
House of Grimaldi
Kelly family
Fashion influencers
Women activists
Monegasque women